Clunker may refer to:

A decrepit car
A western Canadian term for a large hiking boot, often found in outdoors stores
A cruiser bicycle built during the mid Seventies, in Marin county, California. The inspiration for the Mountain bike.